is a 1993 Japanese-only video game on Super Famicom developed by Pandora Box. It is a prequel to Traverse: Starlight & Prairie.

Summary
Being a non-linear role-playing game, the quests can be done in any order although some of them have prerequisites. Most are completely optional, but change the ending. The quests can be abandoned and returned at will.

The game features a time system and the characters are actually aging, though their statistics stay the same. This system is also used for money loans, as you will receive penalties when you don't pay back before the end of the year.

References

1993 video games
Fantasy video games
Japan-exclusive video games
Role-playing video games
Super Nintendo Entertainment System games
Super Nintendo Entertainment System-only games
Video games developed in Japan